Büyükeceli is a town in Mersin Province, Turkey

Geography 

It is near to Mediterranean coast and recent housing of the town is almost at the side side. It is a part of Gülnar district which in turn is a part of Mersin Province. It is on the Mersin Antalya highway. The population was 1685
as of 2012.

Economy 

The main economic activity is agriculture. Tomato, cucumber and aubergine are the most important crops. Fishing and animal husbandry are among the other activities.

Discussion on the nuclear plant 

The first nuclear plant of Turkey is planned to be built in Akkuyu, a location within Büyükeceli. A hotel in the area, known as the Günaştı Sunset Hotel, had to be sold and shut down due to the proximity to what would be the nuclear plant. But there are serious objections to the project (see Human chain against nuclear plant in Turkey).The most important objection is that Büyükeceli and the surrounding coastline may lose its touristic potential after the realization of the project. Büyükeceli residents are also worried that the already low population of the town may further decrease and the town may lose its township status. The government on the other hand, prefers this site because of the low population density and low risk of earthquakes.
In May 2010, Russia and Turkey signed an agreement that a subsidiary of Rosatom would build, own, and operate a power plant at Akkuyu comprising four 1,200 MWe VVER units. The reactors are expected to enter service by 2019.

References

External links 

Populated places in Mersin Province
Populated coastal places in Turkey
Towns in Turkey
Tourist attractions in Mersin Province
Populated places in Gülnar District